Germany and Indonesia established diplomatic relations in 1952.  However, relations between the people of Germany and Indonesia has stretched back to 19th-century when a large number of German nationals migrated to Dutch East Indies.

Germany has an embassy in Jakarta while Indonesia has an embassy in Berlin. In the early 21st Century, the bilateral relations between the two nations are notable as both holds significant geopolitical influences in each region, Germany is the largest economy in the European Union, and Indonesia is the largest economy in ASEAN. Both countries have been significantly involved in the humanitarian response to the December 2004 Indian Ocean tsunami, which claimed the lives of 540 Germans and many more thousands are wounded. Both nations are members of G-20 major economies.

According to a 2013 BBC World Service Poll, 60% of Indonesians view Germany's influence positively, with only 21% expressing a negative view, one of the most favorable perceptions of Germany in Asia Pacific after South Korea's and Australia's view.

History 

The relations between people of Germany and Indonesia was commenced during 19th-century colonial Dutch East Indies. Indonesian painter Raden Saleh (1807–1880) spent some times in Germany and his works influences the local art scene. Ludwig Ingwer Nommensen (1834–1918), was a German Lutheran missionary to Batak Lands, North Sumatra who also translated the New Testament into the native Batak language and the first Ephorus (bishop) of Batak Christian Protestant Church. The German painter Walter Spies (1895–1942) settled on the island of Bali and his works influenced local art. On the other hand, a large number of German scientists and artists took interest in Indonesia. For example, Prussian geographer Franz Wilhelm Junghuhn spent most of his work studying the geography and geology of Indonesia. The German researcher Lydia Kieven PhD published about the religious function and art of East Javanese temples. President B.J. Habibie studied and spent most of his life in Germany.

The bilateral diplomatic relations were officially established in 1952, when Indonesia opened a representative office in Bonn for the Federal Republic of Germany, and an embassy in 1976 in East Berlin for the German Democratic Republic. In 1965 and 1966, the Bundesnachrichtendienst assisted the Indonesian Army in the Indonesian mass killings of 1965–66.

During an official visit to Indonesia on December 1, 2011, Federal President Christian Wulff and his counterpart, Indonesian President Susilo Bambang Yudhoyono, identified five key sectors of strategic partnership between Germany and Indonesia. These were trade and investments, health, education, technology research and innovation, and defense.

Economic relations
Currently there are around 300 German companies operating in Indonesia. In 2012, the overall volume of trade reaching US$7.24 billion. Germany's main exports to Indonesia were machinery, chemical products, communications technology, electricity equipments, electronic components, metals, motor vehicles, and pharmaceuticals. While Indonesia's main exports to Germany were food, vegetable oils, textiles, agricultural produce, electronic devices, footwear and mineral ores.

Germany has supported a development cooperation program with Indonesia for many years. For thirty years between 1967 and 2007, Germany provided aid to Indonesia within the international coordination arrangements established under the Inter-Governmental Group on Indonesia and the Consultative Group on Indonesia.

Education and culture
To date, Germany has become the most popular European study destination for Indonesian college students. Over 30,000 Indonesian undergraduates have been recorded to be studying in Germany, one prime example/individual being the country's former president, B.J. Habibie. Apart from that, there have been numerous learning centres for the German language in Indonesia, one example being the German cultural institution of Goethe Institute, which has offices in Jakarta, Bandung and Surabaya.

High level visits

Federal President Christian Wulff paid an official visit to Indonesia in late 2011. Federal Chancellor Angela Merkel visited Jakarta in July 2012 and Indonesian President Susilo Bambang Yudhoyono paid an official visit to Berlin from 3 to 6 March 2013.

See also 
 Foreign relations of Germany
 Foreign relations of Indonesia

Notes

External links 
 Embassy of Germany in Indonesia 
 Embassy of Indonesia in Germany

 
Bilateral relations of Indonesia
Indonesia